Medius is a genus of moths of the family Erebidae erected by Michael Fibiger in 2011.

Species
Medius calceus Fibiger, 2011
Medius khasisiodes Fibiger, 2011
Medius brassi Fibiger, 2011
Medius nepali Fibiger, 2011
Medius unguisi Fibiger, 2011
Medius kalimantani Fibiger, 2011

References

Micronoctuini
Noctuoidea genera